The Princesa de Asturias class was a class of armoured cruisers of the Spanish Navy during the late 19th and early 20th centuries. With construction beginning on the lead ship of the class in 1890, it was considered to be essentially a repeat of the three s but with more modern and balanced armament. Cardenal Cisneros was wrecked in 1905 but the fate of the other two ships of the Princesa de Asturias class is unknown.

Design

Dimensions and machinery

Armour
However, as these ships were fundamentally modernized Infanta Maria Teresa-class cruisers, the armour coverage was not comprehensive, and thus the ships were poorly armoured by standards of the day.

Armament
The main armament of the ships were two  single turret guns. Secondary armament included eight single  guns.

Ships

  was ordered September 1889 and laid down at the La Carraca shipyard in San Fernando, Cadiz in 1890. She was launched on 17 October 1896, after an unsuccessful launch attempt on 9 October, and commissioned in 1902. She was discarded in 1927.
  was laid down at Cartagena Navy Yard in 1890 and launched on 24 September 1900. She was commissioned in 1903. Cataluña was discarded in 1929.
  was laid down at the Ferrol Dockyard in 1890. She was launched on 19 March 1897 and commissioned in 1902. She was lost when she ran aground on 28 October 1905.

Notes

Sources
 Chesneau, Roger, and Eugene M. Kolesnik, Eds. Conway's All The World's Fighting Ships 1860–1905. New York, New York: Mayflower Books Inc., 1979. .

External links
 Description of class

Cruisers of the Spanish Navy
Cruiser classes